Rodelillo Airfield is a public airport near the Pacific coastal city of Valparaíso in the Valparaíso Region of Chile.

See also

Transport in Chile
List of airports in Chile

References

External links
OpenStreetMap - Rodelillo
OurAirports - Rodelillo
FallingRain - Rodelillo Airport

Airports in Chile
Airports in Valparaíso Region